Konyak may refer to:

 Konyak people, of Nagaland, Northeast India
 Konyak language, the Tibeto-Burman language they speak
 Konyak languages, a Tibeto-Burman linguistic subgroup
 P. Paiwang Konyak, Indian politician

See also 
 Cognac
 Konjak